Medňanský  is a surname of Slovak origin. It derives from the village Medné (now a part of Lednické Rovne) with the suffix "-ský" in the role of nobiliary particle ("of Medné"). The name was influenced by the local Western-Slovak dialect.

It may refer, among others, to the following people:
 Martin Medňanský (1840–1899), Slovak priest, writer and national activist
 László Mednyánszky (1852–1919), Hungarian painter

See also 
 Lednické Rovne

Notes and references